Daphnella crebriplicata, the closely plaited pleurotoma, is a species of sea snail, a marine gastropod mollusk in the family Raphitomidae.

Description
(Original description) The ovate, shell is ventricosely sinuated. The whorls are concentrically closely plaited and transversely closely ridged. The aperture is wide open. The color of the shell is white, profusely variegated with rich orange-brown.

Distribution
This marine species occurs off the Philippines.

References

External links
 

crebriplicata
Gastropods described in 1846